LaToya Antoinette Pringle (born September 11, 1986), a.k.a. LaToya Antoinette Sanders or Lara Sanders, is a former American-Turkish professional basketball player and currently she is an assistant coach for the Washington Mystics of the Women's National Basketball Association (WNBA).. Sanders played college basketball at the University of North Carolina before getting drafted by the Phoenix Mercury in the 2008 WNBA Draft. Currently, she also plays for Kayseri Kaski S.K. in Turkey.

Personal life
Sanders was born in Nuremberg, Germany, where her parents were stationed in the Army. The family later moved to Fayetteville, North Carolina. She is the daughter of Reece and Sharon Pringle and has a younger sister named Shanice. Sanders is married to former UNC men's basketball player Byron Sanders.

High school
LaToya attended Seventy-First High School in Fayetteville, North Carolina. Sanders was named North Carolina's Miss Basketball for Class 4-A in her junior and senior years. She also was named first-team all-state both years. Sanders led Seventy-First to state titles in 2003 and 2004, winning tournament MVP honors on both occasions. As a senior, she totalled 25 points, 18 rebounds and seven blocks in the title game. Sanders set a state championship record with 28 rebounds in the 2003 title game. She also averaged 21.5 points, 14.2 rebounds and nine blocks in her senior season.

College career

Sanders attended the University of North Carolina. As a freshman at UNC she averaged 4.6 points, 3.0 rebounds and 1.5 blocks. She played in 30 games and ranked fifth in the ACC with 1.5 blocks per game. In her junior year she had a breakout season in her first year as a starter. She started all 38 games for the Tar Heels, establishing a school record for games started and games played in a season. She was second on the team and fourth in the ACC in field goal percentage (.550) and second in blocks (3.18 per game). Her 3.18 blocks per game were good for fifth in the NCAA. She registered a block in every game and five or more on eight occasions.

North Carolina statistics
Source

WNBA career
Sanders was drafted in the first round of the 2008 WNBA Draft with the 13th overall pick by the Phoenix Mercury. While in Phoenix she played in 29 games and started 7 of those games. She averaged 13 minutes and 4.4 points per game. Later she suffered an injury and was traded to the Minnesota Lynx. During the off season the Los Angeles Sparks signed Sanders.

In June of 2020, Sanders announced that she would forgo the 2020 WNBA season due to concerns of racism and the coronavirus.

WNBA career statistics

Regular season

|-
| align="left" | 2008
| align="left" | Phoenix
| 29 || 7 || 13.0 || .448 || .000 || .824 || 3.5 || 0.3 || 0.3 || 1.5 || 0.9 || 4.4
|-
| align="left" | 2009
| align="left" | Minnesota
| 17 || 0 || 9.4 || .433 || .000 || .733 || 2.2 || 0.5 || 0.2 || 0.8 || 0.8 || 2.2
|-
| align="left" | 2011
| align="left" | Los Angeles
| 20 || 0 || 11.1 || .473 || 1.000 || .889 || 2.4 || 0.3 || 0.3 || 0.7 || 0.6 || 3.9
|-
| align="left" | 2015
| align="left" | Washington
| 23 || 0 || 18.1 || .402 || .000 || .765 || 5.7 || 0.9 || 0.9 || 2.1 || 0.8 || 5.0
|-
| align="left" | 2016
| align="left" | Washington
| 4 || 0 || 17.3 || .500 || .000 || .846 || 3.0 || 0.3 || 0.8 || 2.5 || 0.8 || 7.3
|-
| align="left" | 2018
| align="left" | Washington
| 28 || 25 || 24.5 || .607 || .000 || .869 || 6.4 || 1.6 || 1.3 || 1.1 || 1.1 || 10.2
|-
|style="text-align:left;background:#afe6ba;"| 2019†
| align="left" | Washington
| 34 || 34 || 23.6 || .506 || .000 || .892 || 5.5 || 1.9 || 0.9 || 1.4 || 0.9 || 6.1
|-
| align="left" | Career
| align="left" | 7 years, 4 teams
| 155 || 66 || 17.6 || .503 || .500 || .840 || 4.5 || 1.0 || 0.7 || 1.3 || 0.9 || 5.7

Playoffs

|-
| align="left" | 2018
| align="left" | Washington
| 9 || 9 || 26.4 || .466 || .000 || .789 || 5.8 || 2.2 || 1.2 || 2.6 || 0.6 || 7.7
|-
|style="text-align:left;background:#afe6ba;"| 2019†
| align="left" | Washington
| 9 || 9 || 23.1 || .424 || .000 || .875 || 3.4 || 1.0 || 1.3 || 1.4 || 0.3 || 6.3
|-
| align="left" | Career
| align="left" | 2 years, 1 team
| 18 || 18 || 24.8 || .444 || .000 || .815 || 4.6 || 1.6 || 1.3 || 2.0 || 0.4 || 7.0

In Turkey

She plays for Kayseri Kaski S.K. in Turkey since the 2010–11 season. After obtaining Turkish citizenship during the 2012–13 season, she adopted the name Lara Sanders. For the 2014 FIBA World Championship for Women, she was selected for the Turkish women's national basketball team.

References

External links
North Carolina Tar Heels bio

1986 births
Living people
Abdullah Gül Üniversitesi basketball players
American women's basketball players
Basketball players at the 2016 Summer Olympics
Basketball players from North Carolina
Centers (basketball)
Los Angeles Sparks players
Minnesota Lynx players
Naturalized citizens of Turkey
North Carolina Tar Heels women's basketball players
Olympic basketball players of Turkey
Phoenix Mercury draft picks
Phoenix Mercury players
Sportspeople from Fayetteville, North Carolina
Turkish women's basketball players
Washington Mystics players